"Higher"  is song performed by Belgian singer Laura Tesoro. The song was released as a digital download on 28 April 2017 by Sony Music Entertainment Belgium. The song peaked at number 21 in Belgium. The song was written by Laura Tesoro, Wouter Vander Veken and produced by Kyle Kelso.

Track listing

Charts

Weekly charts

Year-end charts

Release history

References

2017 singles
2017 songs
Laura Tesoro songs